The 1500 metres distance for men in the 2009–10 ISU Speed Skating World Cup was contested over six races on six occasions, out of a total of seven World Cup occasions for the season, with the first occasion taking place in Berlin, Germany, on 6–8 November 2009, and the final occasion taking place in Heerenveen, Netherlands, on 12–14 March 2010.

Shani Davis of the United States successfully defended his title from the previous season, while Håvard Bøkko of Norway came second, improving on his third place from the previous season, and Denny Morrison of Canada came third.

On the fifth competition weekend, in Salt Lake City, Davis set a new world record of 1:41.04.

Top three

Race medallists

Final standings
Standings as of 14 March 2010 (end of the season).

References

Men 1500